The UEFA Women's U-19 Championship 2012 Final Tournament was held in Antalya, Turkey between 2 and 14 July 2012. Players born after 1 January 1993 were eligible to participate in this competition.

Tournament structure 
The regulations make up for the following tournament structure:

Qualifications
There are two separate rounds of qualifications held before the Final Tournament.

First qualifying round 

In the first qualifying round 40 teams were drawn into 10 groups. The top two of each group and the best third-place finisher, counting only matches against the top two in the group, advanced.

Second qualifying round 

In the second round the 21 teams from the first qualifying round were joined by top seeds Germany, France and England . The 24 teams of this round will be drawn into six groups of four teams. The group winners and the runners-up team with the best record against the sides first and third in their group advance to the final tournament. The draw was held at UEFA headquarters on 15 November 2011.

Final tournament
The 7 teams advancing from the second qualifying round will be joined by host nation Turkey. The eight teams will be drawn into two groups of four with the top two teams of each group advancing to the semi-finals. Denmark qualified as best runners-up in the second qualifying round. Germany, having been the only team to participate in all final tournaments so far, missed out on qualification for the first time. The draw took place on 24 April in Antalya, Turkey.

Group A

Group B

Knockout stage

Bracket

Semifinals

Final

Statistics

Goalscorers
5 goals
 Elin Rubensson

2 goals
 Raquel Pinel
 Virginia Torrecilla
 Malin Diaz

1 goal

 Camilla Andersen
 Christina Bovbjerg
 Anna Fisker
 Karoline Smidt Nielsen
 Micas
 Mara Bâtea
 Marija Ilić
 Ivana Andrés
 Nagore Calderón
 Alexia Putellas
 Amanda Sampedro
 Pauline Hammarlund

Own goals
 Stine Pedersen (playing against Sweden)
 Andreea Corduneanu (playing against Turkey)
 Jasna Djordjević (playing against Sweden)

References

External links
Official website at UEFA.com

 
2012
2012
2012 in women's association football
2012–13 in European football
2012–13 in Turkish football
2012 in Swedish women's football
2012–13 in Spanish women's football
2012–13 in Portuguese football
2012–13 in Danish women's football
2012–13 in English women's football
2012–13 in Serbian football
2012–13 in Romanian football
July 2012 sports events in Europe
2012 in youth association football